Presidential elections were held in Chad on 20 May 2001. Incumbent President Idriss Déby of the Patriotic Salvation Movement was re-elected with 63% of the vote.

Candidates
Déby stood as a candidate for a second term, and was supported by former opponent, Lol Mahamat Choua, leader of the Rally for Democracy and Progress (RDP).

Results

Aftermath
The election results, showing a first-round majority for Déby, were contested by all of the opposition candidates. On 28 May the six opposition candidates were briefly arrested after meeting at the home of one of them, Saleh Kebzabo, and four opposition activists were killed in the action. They were released half-an-hour later.

Two days later, the six candidates and as many as 40 activists were once again arrested as the opposition prepared to lead a funeral procession for one of those killed two days earlier. They were all released after a direct phone call to Déby from the World Bank's President James Wolfensohn. 

Déby was sworn in for another term on 8 August.

References

Presidential elections in Chad
2001 in Chad
Chad
May 2001 events in Africa